Funnies or The Funnies may refer to:
Sunday comics, the comic strip section carried in most western newspapers, almost always in color
The Funnies, a proto-comic book series first published by Dell Publishing in 1929
Funnies Inc., an American comic book packager of the 1930s to 1940s
Funnies (golf), terms used in golf to describe unusual events that are used for gambling
Funnies on Parade, a proto-comic book series published by Eastern Color Printing in 1933
Famous Funnies, a seminal 1930s American comic book series
Hobart's Funnies, the specialised tanks of the British 79th Armoured Division
The Funnies (Monica's Gang), a Mauricio de Sousa's creation related to Monica's Gang